The 1937 Open Championship was the 72nd Open Championship, held 7–9 July at Carnoustie Golf Links in Carnoustie,  Scotland. Henry Cotton won the second of his three Open titles, two strokes ahead of runner-up Reg Whitcombe. The Ryder Cup was held in late June at Southport and Ainsdale Golf Club in North West  and all the members of the victorious American team played in the championship, creating a star-studded field, similar to four years earlier in 1933.

Qualifying took place on 5–6 July, Monday and Tuesday, with 18 holes on the Medal Course (the championship course) and 18 holes on the Burnside Course. The number of qualifiers was increased to the top 140 and ties, having previously been the top 100 and ties. Two-time Masters champion Horton Smith led the qualifiers on 138; the qualifying score was 157 and 141 players advanced, and all the American Ryder Cup players qualified comfortably.

In the opening round on Wednesday, Ed Dudley took the lead with a 70.  Reg Whitcombe led after the first two rounds at two-under 142, with his brother Charles and Dudley two behind on 144, and Cotton was tied for fourth at 146. Only the leading forty players and ties made the 36-hole cut, which was at 153 (+9) and 47 advanced. Previously the top sixty and ties made the cut.

The final two rounds on Friday were played in a steady, cold rain. Whitcombe maintained his lead with a third-round 74, two shots ahead of his brother, while Cotton moved up to three behind. The weather proved to be Whitcombe's downfall in the final round; on the 7th tee, his club slipped out of his hands as he was swinging and the ball traveled only . He ended up taking a six and finished with a 76 and 292 total. Cotton did not seem affected by the conditions and arrived at the 18th needing only a six to lead. His approach shot found a greenside bunker, but he was able to get down in five to post a 290 total. Only Charles Whitcombe could catch Cotton, but his 76 and 294 finished four strokes behind in fourth place.

The American contingent included Byron Nelson and Sam Snead, both of whom were making their Open Championship debuts. Nelson finished fifth but played the Open just once more, returning in 1955. Snead tied for eleventh and played in four more, winning his next in 1946 at St. Andrews. The non-playing captain of the U.S. Ryder Cup team, four-time Open champion Walter Hagen, tied for 26th place in his final Open appearance at age 44.

In his last Open Championship as an amateur, nineteen-year-old Bobby Locke was the only amateur to make the cut and tied for seventeenth. As a professional, he won four times (1949, 1950, 1952, 1957).

Course

Medal (Championship) Course

^ The 6th hole was renamed Hogan's Alley in 2003

Past champions in the field

Made the cut  

Source:

Missed the cut 

Source:

Did not advance past qualifying rounds (Monday & Tuesday):

James Braid (1901, 1905, 1906, 1908, 1910) 161, Sandy Herd (1902) 167.

Did not enter:
 Tommy Armour (1931), Bobby Jones (1926, 1927, 1930), Jim Barnes (1925).

Round summaries

First round
Wednesday, 7 July 1937

Source:

Second round
Thursday, 8 July 1937

Source:

Third round
Friday, 9 July 1937 (morning)

Source:

Final round
Friday, 9 July 1937 (afternoon)

Source:
Amateur: Locke (+16)

References

External links
Carnoustie 1937 (Official site)

The Open Championship
Golf tournaments in Scotland
Sport in Angus, Scotland
Open Championship
Open Championship
Open Championship